The relational meeting is a primary organizing tool used by the Industrial Areas Foundation and other  congregation-based community organizing groups including Gamaliel Foundation and PICO National Network – and also often in union organizing.  It consists of a one-on-one, face-to-face meeting of two persons lasting at least 30 minutes, where personal topics and stories dealing with values, motivations, self-interest and life are discussed in an often confessional, cathartic sort of manner.

Notes

Community building
Community organizing